Fact and Value: Essays on Ethics and Metaphysics for Judith Jarvis Thomson is a 2001 book edited by Alex Byrne, Robert C. Stalnaker and Ralph Wedgwood in which the authors discuss moral and political issues, foundations of moral theory, metaphysics and epistemology. The book is dedicated to Judith Jarvis Thomson.

Philosopher Alan Soble, in a review of this Festschrift proposed 13 conditions that must be satisfied by any adequate Festschrift.

References

External links 
Fact and Value: Essays on Ethics and Metaphysics for Judith Jarvis Thomson

2001 non-fiction books
Festschrifts
MIT Press books
Ethics books
Books in political philosophy